Savate, for the 2013 World Combat Games, took place at the Sports Complex 'Yubileiny' Hall 2, in Saint Petersburg, Russia. The medals were awarded on the 20 and 22 October 2013. Also, these Games marked the debut of this sport because it was not contested in the inaugural 2010 WCG. This sport was demonstrated at the 1924 Summer Olympics in Paris.

Medal table
Key:

Medal summary

Men

Women

References

External links
World Combat Games Savate Results

Savate competitions
2013 World Combat Games events